Jast may refer to:
Joint Advanced Strike Technology (JAST) project was merged with the Common Affordable Lightweight Fighter (CALF) project to make the Joint Strike Fighter program.
JAST USA
Jast, a member of the Cult of Skaro in Doctor Who.
JAST, a Japanese game company known for Tenshitachi no gogo.